SCM U Craiova may refer to:

 SCM U Craiova (basketball), a men's basketball club
 SCM U Craiova (men's volleyball), a men's volleyball club